Humayun Kabir (2 February 1952 – 27 October 2019) was a Bangladeshi lawyer and politician. He was a deputy minister and MP.

Early life
Kabir was born on 2 February 1952 at Poirtola in Comilla District, Pakistan (present day Brahmanbaria District, Bangladesh). His father's name was Bajlur Rahman and his mother's name was Ukilunnesa. He took part in the Liberation War of Bangladesh.

Biography 
Kabir was the general secretary of Brahmanbaria District Awami League. He served as mayor of Brahmanbaria from 1977 to 1982 and 1984 to 1988. He was elected as a member of parliament from Brahmanbaria-3 in 1986 and 1988. He was also appointed deputy minister of Ministry of Health and Family Planning in 1987.

Kabir was married to Nayna Kabir. She is the first female mayoral candidate in the history of Brahmanbaria. She is the first female mayor of Brahmanbaria too.

Death 
Kabir died of cardiac arrest on 27 October 2019 at the age of 67.

References

2019 deaths
Awami League politicians
3rd Jatiya Sangsad members
4th Jatiya Sangsad members
1952 births
People from Brahmanbaria district
20th-century Bangladeshi lawyers
People of the Bangladesh Liberation War
Jatiya Party politicians
Mayors of Brahmanbaria